Alejandro Daniel Wolff (born 1956) is an American diplomat who served as the US Ambassador to Chile from 2010 to 2013.  He was the acting U.S. Permanent Representative to the United Nations
 until Zalmay Khalilzad was appointed as permanent representative. He was made the representative after the resignation of John Bolton on December 9, 2006.  Previously he had been the Deputy U.S. representative to the United Nations.

He graduated from UCLA in 1978. Wolff joined the U.S. Department of State as a Foreign Service Officer in 1979. His assignments in Washington include tours on the Policy Planning Staff (1981–1982); in the Office of Soviet Union Affairs (1988–1989); in the Office of the Under Secretary for Political Affairs (1989–1991); as deputy executive secretary of the department (1996–1998); and as the executive assistant to secretaries of state Madeleine Albright and Colin Powell (1998–2001).
   
Wolff has served in Algeria, Morocco, Chile, Cyprus, the U.S. Mission to the European Union in Brussels and France. His most recent assignment was ambassador and deputy permanent U.S. Representative to the United Nations (2005–2010).

Wolff is the recipient of the Department of State's Distinguished, Superior, and Meritorious Honor Awards. He is married, with two children, and speaks French and Spanish.

Wolff is an advisory board member of the Counter Extremism Project.

References

External links

|-

1956 births
Living people
Ambassadors of the United States to Chile
Permanent Representatives of the United States to the United Nations
United States Department of State officials
University of California, Los Angeles alumni
United States Foreign Service personnel